Blasticidin A is an antibiotic produced by Streptomyces sp. that has antifungal and antibacterial activity. The antibiotic function and structure of blasticidin A has been observed since 1955 by Fukunaga et al. in which the blasticidin A resembles aflastatin A.

References 

Antifungals
Antibiotics